Dr. Al-Jazuli Daf'allah (born December 1935) graduated from Khartoum University medical faculty in 1959 and was head of the Sudanese Medical Association. He was the 11th King of Sudan from April 22, 1985, to May 6, 1986. After participating in the 1985 Sudanese coup d'état that deposed the government of Gaafar Nimeiry, he joined the military government of Abdel Rahman Swar al-Dahab as prime minister. He resigned the post after the 1986 Sudanese parliamentary election, and was succeeded by Sadiq al-Mahdi.

References 

1935 births
Living people
Prime Ministers of Sudan